Dyer often refers to:
 Dyer (occupation), a person who is involved in dyeing

Dyer may also refer to:

Places
 Dyer, Arkansas, a town
 Dyer, Indiana, a town
 Dyer (Amtrak station)
 Dyer, Kentucky, an unincorporated community in Breckinridge County, Kentucky
 Dyer, Nevada, a town
 Dyer, Tennessee, a city
 Dyer, West Virginia, an unincorporated community
 Dyer County, Tennessee
 Dyer Bay, Maine
 Dyer River, Maine
 Dyer Plateau, Palmer Land, Antarctica
 Dyer Point, Ellsworth Land, Antarctica
 Dyer Island (disambiguation), several islands
 Dyer Avenue, in New York
 Camp Dyer, Rhode Island, a temporary camp used during the Spanish–American War
 Dyer State Wayside, a rest stop in Oregon
 78434 Dyer, an asteroid

People
 Dyer (surname)
 Dyer Ball (1796–1866), American missionary and doctor in China
 Dyer Lum (1839–1893), American anarchist labor activist and poet
 Dyer Pearl (1857–1930), American businessman

Other uses
 USS Dyer (DD-84), a United States Navy destroyer
 Dyer Observatory, an astronomical observatory in Brentwood, Tennessee, owned and operated by Vanderbilt University
 Dyer baronets, two baronetcies in the Baronetage of England
 DYER-TV, a Philippine television station

See also 
 Dier (disambiguation)
 Dyre (disambiguation)
 Dyersburg, Tennessee, a city
 Dyersburg (disambiguation)
 Dyer's Case, an old English contract law case
 Justice Dyer (disambiguation)
 Krasilnikov (disambiguation), a surname meaning dyer in Russian